The 1971 CONCACAF Championship, the fifth edition of the CONCACAF Championship, was held in Trinidad and Tobago from 20 November to 5 December.

Qualifying Tournament

Venues

Final tournament

Result

References

External links

 
1971
1971
Championship
CONCACAF
1971–72 in Honduran football
1971–72 in Guatemalan football
football
1971–72 in Costa Rican football
1971–72 in Mexican football